Harvey George Green (February 9, 1915 – July 24, 1970), nicknamed "Buck", was a right-handed pitcher in Major League Baseball.

Green played basketball, soccer, and baseball, and ran track, in high school before he was recruited as a pitcher. He pitched in two games for the 1935 Brooklyn Dodgers, working one inning and allowing two hits and one run.

Notes

External links

1915 births
1970 deaths
Baseball players from Wisconsin
Major League Baseball pitchers
Brooklyn Dodgers players
Sportspeople from Kenosha, Wisconsin
Dayton Ducks players
Reading Brooks players
Allentown Brooks players
Jeanerette Blues players
Winston-Salem Twins players
People from Franklin, Louisiana